Limersheim is a commune in the Bas-Rhin department in Alsace in north-eastern France. It is a rural tourist destination, boasting several half-timbered houses.

Geography
Limersheim is positioned on the Alsace Plain, approximately eight kilometres (five miles) west of the river Rhine and some sixteen kilometres (ten miles) to the south of Strasbourg.  Adjacent communes are Hindisheim und Nordhouse. The village is less than a kilometre away from departmental road RD1083, a four lane trunk road which until the extension of the autoroute network early in the twenty-first century was part of the main north-south highway through Alsace.

The village is located in the Alsace wine producing area and there is accordingly within it a street named "Rue du Vin". The rich alluvial soil characteristic of the land near this part of the Rhine is also used for the cultivation of other crops including cereals, tobacco and potatoes.

See also
 Communes of the Bas-Rhin department

References

Communes of Bas-Rhin
Bas-Rhin communes articles needing translation from French Wikipedia